The 1997–98 St. Francis Terriers men's basketball team represented St. Francis College during the 1997–98 NCAA Division I men's basketball season. The team had been coached by Ron Ganulin in his seventh year at the helm of the St. Francis Terriers. The Terrier's home games were played at the  Generoso Pope Athletic Complex. The team had been members of the Northeast Conference since 1981.

The Terriers finished their season at 15–12 overall and 10–6 in conference play. With the third seed in the NEC Tournament, St. Francis had played in the quarterfinals and lost to Wagner 76–77 in overtime. After the season had ended, Ron Ganulin was announced as the NEC Coach of the Year and Richy Dominguez was named Newcomer of the Year.

Roster

Schedule and results

|-
!colspan=12 style="background:#0038A8; border: 2px solid #CE1126;;color:#FFFFFF;"| Regular season

   

|-
!colspan=12 style="background:#0038A8; border: 2px solid #CE1126;;color:#FFFFFF;"| 1998 NEC tournament

References

St. Francis Brooklyn Terriers men's basketball seasons
St. Francis
St. Francis
St. Francis